This was the first edition of the tournament.

Chen Ti and Jason Jung won the title after defeating Dean O'Brien and Ruan Roelofse 6–4, 3–6, [10–8] in the final.

Seeds

Draw

Draw

References 
 Main Draw

Doubles
KPN Renewables Bangkok Open - Doubles
 in Thai tennis